General Peter Graaff (21 January 1936 – 24 March 2014) was a Dutch military officer who served as Chief of the Defence Staff between 1988 and 1992.

References

External links 
 

1936 births
2014 deaths
Chiefs of the Defence Staff (Netherlands)